The 1993 Sacramento State Hornets football team represented California State University, Sacramento as a member of the American West Conference (AWC) during the 1993 NCAA Division I-AA football season. Led by first-year head coach Mike Clemons, Sacramento State compiled an overall record of 4–6 with a mark of 2–2 in conference play, placing third in the AWC. The team was outscored by its opponents 319 to 232 for the season. The Hornets played home games at Hornet Stadium in Sacramento, California.

This was the first season that Sacramento State competed at the NCAA Division I-AA level, as they had previously played at the NCAA Division II level from 1973 to 1992. The Hornets has been members of the Western Football Conference (WFC), which folded after the 1992 season.

Schedule

References

Sacramento State
Sacramento State Hornets football seasons
Sacramento State Hornets football